Don Zimmerman is an American film editor.

His first job as lead editor was the film Coming Home, for which he was nominated for an Academy Award at the 51st Academy Awards.

Early life 
Zimmerman initially studied to become a veterinarian. He served in Vietnam, and later became a music editor. He moved into film editing after meeting director Hal Ashby, who was also an editor at the time.

Career 
Zimmerman began his career in 1969 as an apprentice editor in music and sound effects working for the Mirisch Co. on films such as: The Hawaiians, Gaily, Gaily, Little Big Man, The Godfather, Where's Papa and Jonathan Livingston Seagull. He then became a picture assistant editor for director Hal Ashby on films such as: "The Landlord,"  “Harold and Maude,” “Shampoo” and “Being There.”. Zimmerman went on to work with director Hal Ashby on six films including "Coming Home," for which he received an Academy Awards nomination.

In 1993, Zimmerman began working with director Tom Shadyac. Zimmerman went on to work with Shadyac on "Ace Ventura: Pet Detective" ,"The Nutty Professor", "Patch Adams", and "Liar Liar".

Personal life 
Zimmerman is married to Donna Zimmerman. The couple have five children, all of whom are in the film business. Sons Dean, Danny and David are all film editors. Debi is a costumer. Dana works in post-production.

Filmography

Bill & Ted Face the Music (2020)
Red 2 (2013)
Men in Black 3 (2012)
Marmaduke (2010)
Night at the Museum: Battle of the Smithsonian (2009)
Jumper (2008)
Night at the Museum (2006)
Fun with Dick and Jane (2005)
Flight of the Phoenix (2004)
The Cat in the Hat (2003)
Just Married (2003)
Dragonfly (2002)
Galaxy Quest (1999)
Brokedown Palace (1999) - uncredited
Patch Adams (1998)
Half Baked (1998)
Liar Liar (1997)
The Nutty Professor (1996)
A Walk in the Clouds (1995)
The Scout (1994)
Ace Ventura: Pet Detective (1994)
Leap of Faith (1992)
Diggstown (1992)
The Prince of Tides (1991)
Navy SEALs (1990)
The Package (1989)
Everybody's All-American (1988)
Fatal Beauty (1987)
Over the Top (1987)
Cobra (1986)
Rocky IV (1985)
My Man Adam (1985)
Teachers (1984)
Staying Alive (1983)
Best Friends (1982)
Rocky III (1982)
Barbarosa (1982)
A Change of Seasons (1980)
Being There (1979)
Heaven Can Wait (1978)
Coming Home (1978)

References

External links

Don Zimmerman at Rotten Tomatoes

American Cinema Editors
American film editors
Living people
People from Flint, Michigan
Year of birth missing (living people)